Nagahoribashi Station (長堀橋駅, Nagahoribashi-eki) is a railway station on the Osaka Metro in Chūō-ku, Osaka, Japan. It is very close to Shinsaibashi Station, within a five minute walk.

Lines
Osaka Metro
Sakaisuji Line (K16)
Nagahori Tsurumi-ryokuchi Line (N16)

Layout
Platform for each line is an island platform with two tracks.
The platform for the Nagahori Tsurumi-ryokuchi Line is fenced with platform gates.
Sakaisuji Line

Nagahori Tsurumi-ryokuchi Line

Around the station
Crysta Nagahori

Stations next to Nagahoribashi

|-
!colspan=5|Osaka Metro

External links
  Nagahoribashi Station - Sakaisuji Line from Osaka Metro website
  Nagahoribashi Station - Sakaisuji Line from Osaka Metro website
  Nagahoribashi Station - Nahahori Tsurumi-ryokuchi Line from Osaka Metro website
  Nagahoribashi Station - Nahahori Tsurumi-ryokuchi Line from Osaka Metro website

References

Chūō-ku, Osaka
Osaka Metro stations
Railway stations in Japan opened in 1969